K. Shanthakumari (born 197?) is an Indian politician serving as the MLA of Kongad Constituency since May 2021. She is a member of Communist Party of India (Marxist)

References 

Kerala MLAs 2021–2026
Communist Party of India (Marxist) politicians from Kerala
Year of birth missing (living people)
Living people
Communist Party of India politicians from Kerala